Llazar Sotir Gusho (27 December 189912 November 1987), commonly known by the pen name Lasgush Poradeci, was an Albanian philologist, poet, translator, writer and pioneer of modern Albanian literature. He is regarded as one of the most influential Albanian writers of the 20th century whose works are directly connected with Romanticism and Realism. 

Born in the small town of Pogradec on the Lake of Ohrid, then in the Ottoman Empire, he completed his primary and secondary education in Monastir and Athens, and thus received his academic education at the universities of Bucharest and Graz. He developed and maintained close liaison with Asdreni, Ernest Koliqi, Gjergj Fishta and Mitrush Kuteli who all of them became among the most outstanding Albanian writers of that time.

Poradeci is best remembered for his poetry collections Vallja e yjve and Ylli i zemrës inspired by the traditions and peculiarities of Albanian life. His style is characterised for its stylistic and technical achievement, its form and content as well as its engagement with nature, eroticism and philosophy. He notably translated several major English, French, German, Italian and Russian works into Albanian.

Aside from his literary achievements, Poradeci is also uniquely known in Albania for having been a 33 degree freemason, which is also the highest degree within Freemasonry. This was proved following the release of documents from a masonic lodge in Bucharest, Romania.

Biography

Life and career 

Lasgush Poradeci was born on 27 December 1899 in the town of Pogradec at the western coast of the Lake of Ohrid in what was then part of the Ottoman Empire , now Republic of Albania. In his native town he properly received his primary formal education at an Albanian primary school and attended a Romanian school in Monastir upon his completion from 1906 to 1916.

During the First World War, Poradeci's father, despite the tenuous relations between Albanians and Greeks in southeastern Albania at that time, directed him to Greece to continue his education, on the condition that he won't study at a Greek institution. He therefore attended the French Lycée Léonin in Athens until 1920. In Athens, he spent his last two years in a sanatorium due to health reasons to which, despite his desperate financial situation, he was referred with the assistance of Sophia Schliemann.
 
Although not completely recovered, Poradeci migrated to Bucharest after one year and rejoined his brother. In Bucharest, he enrolled at the University of Arts and entered the Albanian association for the Albanian diaspora of Romania later being elected its secretary. It was in the city that he met his fellows Asdreni, Mitrush Kuteli and numerous other Romanian poets and writers.

In 1924, Fan Noli awarded Poradeci a scholarship to continue his higher education abroad. He immediately left for Berlin, where he hoped to study under Albanologist Norbert Jokl, and continued on to the University of Graz whereas he attended the Faculty of Romano-German philology and finished a doctorate there in 1933.

In the 1930s he is purported to have had an affair with the painter Androniqi Zengo Antoniu.

Poradeci voluntarily returned to Albania the following year to teach arts at a secondary school in Tirana. From 1944 to 1947, he subsequently became unemployed within a period characterised by the end of the Second World War and the beginning of the Communism in Albania. He lived with his wife in Tirana on the latter’s meagre salary as a teacher. After brief employment at the Institute of Science, forerunner of the University of Tirana, he translated literature for the state-owned Naim Frashëri publishing company until his retirement in 1974. He died in poverty at his home in Tirana on 12 November 1987.

Writings and publications 

Lasgush Poradeci was undoubtedly fascinated by the aesthetics of nature. Visible in his poem Poradeci, he admired the environment of his beloved hometown Pogradec at the Lake of Ohrid which never ceased to fascinate and enchant him. His poetic creations are based on the four elements, earth, water, air and fire, which are the essential themes in his poetry. He further divided poetry between landscape poems, love poems and philosophical poems while all his poems are essentially meditative-philosophical.

He composed two extraordinary collections of poetry including Vallja e yjve and Ylli i zemrës both published in Romania in 1933 and 1937 respectively. His poetry is far away from being Romantic and engaging compared to the poetry of the Albanian Renaissance. It is characterised by deep thoughts, labyrinthine feelings and powerful universal ideas.  
 
During the same period, he contributed verses to the Albanian weekly newspaper Shqipëri' e re (New Albania). Other Poradeci works include "The theological excursion of Socrates", "About to", "Kamadeva", "Ballads of Muharrem" and "Reshit Collaku". The entire work that Lasgush Poradeci made was all about Pogradec, his birthplace.

Poradeci's complete works were published in 1989.

Poradeci has been also active in translating several notable international literary works into the Albanian language.

See also 
 List of Albanian writers
 Albanians of Romania
 Albanian League of Writers and Artists

Notes

References 

1899 births
1987 deaths
Albanian philologists
Albanian-language poets
Romanian–Albanian translators
German–Albanian translators
Albanian poets
Albanian male poets
Albanian translators
Translators to Albanian
Albanian writers
Albanian male writers
19th-century Albanian people
20th-century Albanian poets
20th-century Albanian writers
People from Pogradec
People from Manastir vilayet
People from Korçë County
University of Graz alumni
20th-century translators
20th-century philologists
Members of the Parliament of Albania
20th-century pseudonymous writers